Kat Burns is a Canadian musician known as KASHKA who was the lead songwriter and vocalist of Forest City Lovers. She is also a visual artist and voice over actor.

Career 
Burns led folk-pop band Forest City Lovers from 2006 to 2012, releasing three full-length albums and one vinyl single with the band before their indefinite hiatus. In 2010, she started KASHKA as a side project and has since taken it on full-time. She has released two full-length albums and a number of singles under the "KASHKA" moniker. Burns is also involved in community organisations  Girls Rock Camp Toronto and SKETCH.

Discography

KASHKA 
 Relax (2017)
 Port William Instrumentals (2017)
 Heavy Ghost single (2016)
 Bones EP (2014)
 Bound (2013)
 Vichada (2012)

Forest City Lovers 
 The Sun and the Wind (2006)
 Haunting Moon Sinking (2008)
 Phodilus & Tyto (2009)
 Carriage (2010)

Kat Burns 
 For the Birds (2005)

Guest appearances 
 "Don't Go, Please" by Forest City Lovers on the  Friends In Bellwoods compilation (Out of This Spark, 2007)
 "Minneapolis" by Forest City Lovers on the  Friends In Bellwoods II compilation (Out of This Spark, 2009)

Music videos

KASHKA 
 Body Like Lead (2015) directed by Stephanie Markowitz.
 Salmon Arms (Acoustic) (2014) directed by Kat Burns.
 Never Had It (2013) directed by Daniel Tahmazian. 
 Bloodlines (2013) directed by Adam Seward.
 Winter Light' (2012) directed by Kat Burns.
 Vichada (2012) directed by Kat Burns.

 Forest City Lovers 
 Song for Morrie (2007) directed by  Stuart A. McIntyre 
 Pirates (2008) directed by Kat Burns.
 Tell Me, Cancer (2010) directed by Ryan Marr.
 If I Were A Tree (2010) co-directed by Jared Raab and Colin Medley
 Keep the Kids Inside (2011) directed by Isotoica

Awards

 KASHKA 
 Soundclash Music Awards 2013 (finalist) 

 Forest City Lovers 
 Verge Music Awards Artist of the Year 2011 (nominee)
 Verge Music Awards Album of the Year 2011'' (nominee)

References

Actresses from Oshawa
Living people
Canadian indie pop musicians
Canadian voice actresses
Canadian songwriters
Musicians from Oshawa
Writers from Ontario
Year of birth missing (living people)